The Little Nerang Dam is a concrete gravity dam with an un-gated spillway across the Little Nerang Creek that is located in the South East region of  Queensland, Australia. The main purpose of the dam is for potable water supply of the Gold Coast region. The impounded reservoir is also called Little Nerang Dam. The dam was closed to the public in 2013 due to safety concerns.

Location and features
Prior to the completion of the Hinze Dam, the Little Nerang Creek Gravity Scheme supplied the water requirements of the Gold Coast area. Water flows by gravity pipeline to the Mudgeeraba Water Treatment Plant. The plant, completed in 1969, has the capacity to treat  a day. The water then flows by gravity to the city's storage reservoirs.

The  dam wall holds back the  reservoir when at full capacity. Initially managed by Gold Coast Water, management of the dam was transferred to Seqwater in July 2008.

Recreational
Recreation is not permitted at Little Nerang Dam. As of 2019, Access to Little Nerang Dam and Little Nerang Dam Road Seqwater is now restricted to SEQWater employees and residents of the road, with a large security gate blocking access.

See also
List of dams in Queensland
Gold Coast Water

References

External links 

Buildings and structures on the Gold Coast, Queensland
Reservoirs in Queensland
Dams completed in 1962
Dams in Queensland
Gravity dams
Springbrook, Queensland